Ambiances Magnétiques is a Canadian record company and label started by Jean Derome, René Lussier, and others, and the artists' collective that preceded it.

History
In 1982, "guitarist René Lussier and saxophonist/flutist Jean Derome presented a few duo concerts in Montreal under the name Ambiances Magnétiques [...] They teamed up with guitarist André Duchesne and clarinetist Robert Marcel Lepage and launched the label Ambiances Magnétiques in 1983". The label was managed by a collective, and its releases were of performances by its members and close associates until the late 1990s. In this initial period, several others were added to the core group: Joane Hétu, Diane Labrosse, Danielle P. Roger, Michel F. Côté and Martin Tétreault.

As a group, they performed together only twice, including for the album Une Théorie des Ensembles. The collective also formed a distribution outlet and production companies that organise events. The label had released 90 albums by the end of the year 2000.

See also
 List of record labels

References

External links
Ambiances Magnétiques Official site
actuellecd.com Official site for DAME

Quebec record labels
Musical collectives
Record labels established in 1983
Jazz record labels
Classical music record labels
Folk record labels
Rock record labels
Musical groups established in 1982
1982 establishments in Canada